Justice Green or Justice Greene may refer to:

Adrian Lawrence Greene, associate justice of the Kansas Supreme Court
Clayton Greene Jr., judge of the Maryland Court of Appeals
George Greene (judge), associate justice of the Iowa Supreme Court
Grafton Green, associate justice of the Tennessee Supreme Court
Henry Green (English judge), chief justice of the Court of King's Bench
Henry Green (Pennsylvania judge), chief justice of the Supreme Court of Pennsylvania
John W. Green, associate justice of the Virginia Supreme Court of Appeals
Nathan Green Sr., associate justice of the Tennessee Supreme Court
Paul W. Green, associate justice of the Supreme Court of Texas
Richard Ward Greene, chief justice of the Rhode Island Supreme Court
Samuel Green (judge), associate justice of the New Hampshire Supreme Court
Sanford M. Green, associate justice of the Michigan Supreme Court
Thomas C. Green, associate justice of the Supreme Court of Appeals of West Virginia
Thomas Greene (Rhode Island), associate justice of the Rhode Island Supreme Court